Walter Shirley may refer to:

Walter Shirley (MP) (died 1425), member of the Parliament of England for Salisbury
Walter Shirley (priest and controversialist) (1725–1786), English Calvinist-Methodist
Walter Shirley (bishop) (1797–1847), grandson of the controversialist
Walter Shirley (priest and historian) (1828–1866), son of the bishop
Walter Shirley Shirley (1851–1888), English barrister, law writer and politician
Walter Shirley, 11th Earl Ferrers (1864–1937), English peer and architect